Sianab-e Parab (also Romanized as Sīānāb-e Pārāb; also known as Seteh and Sūteh) is a village in Khaneh Shur Rural District, in the Central District of Salas-e Babajani County, Kermanshah Province, Iran. At the 2006 census, its population was 196, in 44 families.

References 

Populated places in Salas-e Babajani County